Otto Göbl (16 September 1936 – 17 July 2009) was a West German bobsledder who competed from the late 1950s to the early 1960s. He won four medals at the FIBT World Championships, taking home one gold (Four-man: 1962), two silvers (Two-man: 1960, four-man: 1958), and one bronze (Four-man: 1959). Göbl also finished fifth in the four-man event at the 1964 Winter Olympics in Innsbruck.

References
Bobsleigh two-man world championship medalists since 1931
Bobsleigh four-man world championship medalists since 1930
Wallenchinsky, David. (1984). "Bobsled: Four-man". In The Complete Book of the Olympics: 1896-1980. New York: Penguin Books. p. 561.
Otto Göbl's obituary 

1936 births
2009 deaths
German male bobsledders
Bobsledders at the 1964 Winter Olympics
Olympic bobsledders of the United Team of Germany